Suna Koç Kıraç (born Suna Koç; June 3, 1941 – September 15, 2020) was a Turkish businesswoman and a billionaire.

Early years
Suna Koç was born to Vehbi Koç (1901–1996), the wealthiest businessman of Turkey, and his wife Sadberk (1908–1973) on June 3, 1941. She became the vice president of Koç Holding. She married İnan Kıraç, then a high-level executive of Koç Holding. As they were unable to have a biological child, they adopted a four-month old baby girl named İpek in their 15th year of marriage.

Museum
Suna Kıraç and her husband established a foundation for culture and education. The foundation opened the Pera Museum in 2005, which exhibits three valuable art collections of the Kıraç family.

Awards 
Suna Kıraç was awarded the State Medal of Distinguished Service by the Turkish Council of Ministers for her contributions to education, health and social services in the country on September 23, 1997. She received the award from President Süleyman Demirel on October 27, 1997.

In 2008, she was awarded an honorary doctorate degree from the Boğaziçi University for her contribution to education.

Autobiography
In 1998, she published an autobiography, in which she wrote about her life, her marriage, how she adopted her daughter İpek, her professional years, her illness and her dreams.
 Ömrümden Uzun İdeallerim Var!, 1998 ("I Have Ideals Longer Than My Life!").

Illness and death
She experienced the first symptoms of her illness shortly after her father's death and her involvement in the family business. In 1996, she suffered aphonia. The next year, her hands began to fall asleep, and one year later, she began to lisp. She was diagnosed in the Houston Methodist Hospital with amyotrophic lateral sclerosis (ALS), a specific disease that causes the death of neurons which control voluntary muscles.

Kıraç was paralyzed throughout her entire body in 2000. She could not make any movements, walk, or talk, and she communicated only through eye movement. When she wanted to express a will, she winked for the right letter on a Turkish alphabet show card.

Kıraç died on 15 September 2020 in American Hospital (Istanbul) at the age of 79. She was interred at Zincirlikuyu Cemetery following a memorial ceremony before the headquarters of Koç Holding and the religious funeral service held at of the Divinity (academic discipline) mosque of Marmara University.

See also 
 Koç family
 List of Turkish billionaires by net worth

References 

1941 births
2020 deaths
Koç family
People from Keçiören
Alumni of Arnavutköy American High School for Girls
Boğaziçi University alumni
Turkish women in business
Turkish businesspeople
Turkish billionaires
Museum founders
Neurological disease deaths in Turkey
Deaths from motor neuron disease
Female billionaires